KPEJ-TV (channel 24) is a television station licensed to Odessa, Texas, United States, serving as the Fox affiliate for the Permian Basin area. It is owned by Mission Broadcasting, which maintains a shared services agreement (SSA) with Nexstar Media Group, owner of Midland-licensed ABC affiliate KMID (channel 2), for the provision of certain services. Both stations share studios on Windview Street (along I-20) in southwestern Odessa, while KPEJ-TV's transmitter is located on FM 1788 in rural southeastern Andrews County.

History
The station first signed on the air on June 16, 1986; it originally operated as an independent station. However, despite not officially identifying as a Fox affiliate, it did carry the few Fox prime time programs that aired in the network's early years. In 1990, KPEJ became the Midland–Odessa market's Fox affiliate. In 1998, the station began carrying programming from the United Paramount Network (UPN) as a secondary affiliation; UPN programming moved to CBS affiliate KOSA-TV (channel 7) in 2003, when that station launched a second digital subchannel (later affiliated with MyNetworkTV and now with The CW+ as a satellite of KCWO-TV (channel 4)). In August 2007, KPEJ changed its on-air branding from "Fox 24" to "Fox West Texas"; the following year, it reverted to the "Fox 24" brand, but continued to use the "Fox West Texas" brand for its website and other special promotions.

On April 24, 2013, the Communications Corporation of America announced the sale of its television stations to the Nexstar Broadcasting Group, owner of ABC affiliate KMID (channel 2). Since the Odessa–Midland market has only eight full-power stations, Nexstar could not legally purchase KPEJ (Federal Communications Commission rules require a market to have eight remaining unique station owners after a duopoly is formed). In addition, KMID and KPEJ are two of the four highest-rated stations in the market in monthly total-day viewership, respectively ranking at third and fourth place. As a result, Nexstar planned to sell KPEJ's license assets to Mission Broadcasting, with Nexstar assuming the station's operation under a shared services agreement, which would have formed a virtual duopoly with KMID.

However, on June 6, 2014, Nexstar announced that it would instead sell KPEJ-TV, along with two other Fox affiliates—sister station KMSS-TV in Shreveport, Louisiana and KLJB in Davenport, Iowa—to the Marshall Broadcasting Group (marking the company's first television station acquisitions) for $58.5 million. The minority-owned Marshall intends to fund the acquisitions through borrowings guaranteed by Nexstar, and are subject to FCC approval of the other stations Nexstar plans to acquire from ComCorp, White Knight Broadcasting and Grant Broadcasting; Marshall plans to launch news operations and provide sports and minority-oriented public affairs programming to KMSS and the other two stations, with Nexstar providing sales and certain non-programming services (including engineering, master control and other administrative functions). The sale was completed on January 1, 2015.

On December 3, 2019, Marshall Broadcasting Group filed for Chapter 11 bankruptcy protection. Mission Broadcasting, another company associated with Nexstar Media Group, agreed to purchase Marshall Broadcasting's stations for $49 million on March 30, 2020. The transaction was completed on September 1, 2020.

Programming
After Fox acquired the rights to the NFL's National Football Conference in 1994, KPEJ has carried preseason football games from the Dallas Cowboys, along with team owner Jerry Jones' weekly game discussion program. In 2010, KPEJ also acquired the rights to Houston Texans preseason games, which aired on tape delay if the game started while a Cowboys pre-game broadcast or preseason game telecast was ongoing. KPEJ lost the Dallas Cowboys preseason games to NBC affiliate KWES-TV in 2011, resulting in KPEJ broadcasting Texans preseason games live. In 2014, KMID acquired the rights to the Dallas Cowboys preseason games. When conflicts exist that won't allow KMID to air the games, KPEJ has been given the rights to air the Dallas Cowboys preseason games. When Dallas plays Houston in the preseason, KMID airs the Dallas broadcast while KPEJ airs the Texans broadcast.

Technical information

Subchannels
The station's digital signal is multiplexed:

Analog-to-digital conversion
KPEJ-TV shut down its analog signal, over UHF channel 24, on June 12, 2009, the official date in which full-power television stations in the United States transitioned from analog to digital broadcasts under federal mandate. The station's digital signal remained on its pre-transition UHF channel 23. Through the use of PSIP, digital television receivers display the station's virtual channel as its former UHF analog channel 24.

References

External links
 (shared with KMID)

Fox network affiliates
Estrella TV affiliates
Rewind TV affiliates
Television channels and stations established in 1986
PEJ-TV
1986 establishments in Texas
Nexstar Media Group